Skaland is a village in Senja Municipality in Troms og Finnmark county, Norway. The population (2001) was 236.

The main employer in the area is the graphite factory, Skaland Grafitverk which was founded in 1917. Berg Church is also located in the village. The village was the administrative center of the old Berg Municipality until 1 January 2020 when it was merged into Senja Municipality.

Media gallery

References

Villages in Troms
Populated places of Arctic Norway
Senja